Rafał Michał Ambrozik (born 8 December 1979) is a Polish politician. He was elected to the Senate of Poland (10th term) representing the constituency of Piotrków Trybunalski.

He was born in Rawa Mazowiecka.

References 

Living people
1979 births
20th-century Polish politicians
21st-century Polish politicians
Members of the Senate of Poland 2019–2023